The Phrynophiurida (formerly called Euryalae) are an order of brittle stars containing the basket stars.

Characteristics
Phrynophiurida have bursae for gas exchange and excretion. Their ventral arm shields are rudimentary, and dorsal shields usually absent. Arms sometimes are branched, and can coil vertically.  The vertebrae are joined by hourglass-shaped surfaces. The madreporite is on  the oral surface. Digestive glands are confined to central disc.  The integument is leathery, bearing calcareous granules or platelets. They generally live in deep-sea waters, coiling their arms on branched black coral.

Systematics
The Asteronychidae have a large disk and slender arms, and the Asteroschematidae have a small disk and stout arms.

One remaining family, the Ophiomyxidae, differs in having a soft, unprotected integument, like that of Ophiocanops, but lacks the peculiar features of the gut and gonads in oegophiurids.

Phrynophiurida are divided into the following suborders and families:
Euryalina
Asteronychidae
Asteroschematidae
Gorgonocephalidae
Euryalidae
Ophiomyxina
Ophiomyxidae
?Ophiocanopidae
The inclusion of Ophiocanopidae is supported by some modern studies, but not yet generally accepted.

References

 
Ophiuroidea
Echinoderm orders